Dear Santa may refer to:
 Dear Santa (1998 film) 
 Dear Santa (2005 film)
 Dear Santa (2011 film)
 Dear Santa (EP), by Girls' Generation-TTS, 2015
 "Dear Santa", a song from the 1999 album I Wanna Be Santa Claus by Ringo Starr
 "Dear Santa", a song from the 2017 album Tears on the Dancefloor: Crying at the Disco by Steps
 "Dear Santa (Bring Me A Man This Christmas)", a song from the 1983 album Success by The Weather Girls

See also